Uncial 0183 (in the Gregory-Aland numbering), is a Greek uncial manuscript of the New Testament, dated palaeographically to the 7th century.

Description 

The codex contains a small parts of the First Epistle to the Thessalonians 3:6-9; 4:1-5, on one parchment leaf (26 cm by 16 cm). The text is written in one column per page, 28 lines per page, in uncial letters. 

The Greek text of this codex is a representative of the Alexandrian text-type, with many singular omissions. Aland placed it in Category III. 

Currently it is dated by the INTF to the 7th century.
According to Karl Wessely it was found in Fayyum.

The codex currently is housed at the Papyrus Collection of the Austrian National Library (Pap. G. 39785) in Vienna.

See also 

 List of New Testament uncials
 Textual criticism

References

Further reading 

 Griechische und koptische Texte theologischen inhalts, Studien zur Paläographie und Papyruskunde, (Leipzig 1912) reprinted (Amsterdam 1966)
 W. Till, Papyrussammlung der Nationalbibliothek in Wien: Katalog der Koptischen Bibelstucke. Der Pergamente, ZNW 39 (1940).
  

Greek New Testament uncials
7th-century biblical manuscripts
Biblical manuscripts of the Austrian National Library